Rodriguezia, abbreviated Rdza. in the horticultural trade, is a genus of orchids. It consists of 49 known species, native to tropical America from southern Mexico and the Windward Islands south to Argentina, with many of the species endemic to Brazil.

List of species
Species accepted as of June 2014:

Rodriguezia antioquiana Kraenzl - Colombia
Rodriguezia arevaloi Schltr. - Colombia
Rodriguezia bahiensis Rchb.f. - Brazil
Rodriguezia batemanii Poepp. & Endl. - Venezuela, Ecuador, Brazil, Peru
Rodriguezia bifolia Barb.Rodr - Rio de Janeiro
Rodriguezia bockiae D.E.Benn. & Christenson - Peru
Rodriguezia brachystachys Rchb.f. & Warm. in H.G.Reichenbach - Minas Gerais
Rodriguezia bracteata (Vell.) Hoehne - Brazil
Rodriguezia bungerothii Rchb.f. - Colombia, Venezuela
Rodriguezia caloplectron  Rchb.f. - Colombia, Peru
Rodriguezia candelariae Kraenzl - Costa Rica
Rodriguezia candida Bateman ex Lindl. - Venezuela, Brazil, French Guiana, Suriname
Rodriguezia carnea Lindl. - Venezuela, Ecuador, Brazil, Peru
Rodriguezia chasei Dodson & D.E.Benn. - Ecuador, Peru
Rodriguezia chimorensis Dodson & R.Vásquez - Bolivia
Rodriguezia cinnabarina H.G.Jones - Guyana
Rodriguezia claudiae Chiron - Peru
Rodriguezia compacta Schltr. - Costa Rica, Nicaragua, Panama
Rodriguezia cuentillensis Kraenzl. - Colombia
Rodriguezia decora  (Lem.) Rchb.f. - Brazil, Argentina, Paraguay
Rodriguezia delcastilloi D.E.Benn. & Christenson - Peru
Rodriguezia dressleriana R.González - Nayarit, Jalisco
Rodriguezia ensiformis Ruiz & Pav.  - Peru
Rodriguezia fernandezii Dodson & D.E.Benn.   - Peru
Rodriguezia granadensis (Lindl.) Rchb.f. - Colombia
Rodriguezia huebneri Schltr. - Brazil
Rodriguezia × kayasimae V.T.Rodrigues & Vinhos - São Paulo  (R. decora × R. obtusifolia)
Rodriguezia lanceolata Ruiz & Pav. - St. Vincent, Trinidad, Panama, Colombia, Venezuela, the Guianas, Peru, Ecuador, Brazil
Rodriguezia leeana Rchb.f. - Venezuela, Ecuador, Brazil
Rodriguezia lehmannii Rchb.f. - Colombia, Ecuador
Rodriguezia leucantha Barb.Rodr. - Espírito Santo, Rio de Janeiro
Rodriguezia limae Brade - Espírito Santo, Rio de Janeiro
Rodriguezia luteola N.E.Br. - Guyana, Brazil
Rodriguezia macrantha Schltr. - Colombia
Rodriguezia negrensis (Barb.Rodr.) Cogn. in C.F.P.von Martius & auct. suc. - Brazil
Rodriguezia obtusifolia (Lindl.) Rchb.f. - Brazil
Rodriguezia pardina Rchb.f. - Espírito Santo
Rodriguezia pubescens (Lindl.) Rchb.f. - Brazil
Rodriguezia pulcherrima Bogarín, Pupulin & H.Medina - Ecuador
Rodriguezia pulchra Løjtnant - Ecuador, Peru
Rodriguezia refracta (Lindl. ex Linden) Rchb.f. - Ecuador, Peru
Rodriguezia ricii R.Vásquez & Dodson - Bolivia
Rodriguezia rigida (Lindl.) Rchb.f. - Brazil
Rodriguezia satipoana Dodson & D.E.Benn. - Peru
Rodriguezia sticta M.W.Chase - Espírito Santo, Minas Gerais, Rio de Janeiro
Rodriguezia strobellii Garay - Ecuador, Peru
Rodriguezia sucrei Braga - Rio de Janeiro
Rodriguezia vasquezii Dodson - Bolivia
Rodriguezia venusta  (Lindl.) Rchb.f. - Guyana, Suriname, Venezuela, Ecuador, Brazil

References

External links
Les Orchidées du genre Rodriguezia, photos and descriptions of numerous species

 
Orchids of the Caribbean
Orchids of Central America
Orchids of Mexico
Orchids of South America
Oncidiinae genera